Since the Syrian civil war, the United Kingdom has supported the Syrian opposition.  The United Kingdom closed its embassy in Syria in 2011, and the Embassy of Syria, London was closed the following year.

History

1950s 
On 6 November 1956, during the Suez Crisis, a Royal Air Force Canberra PR.7 was sent to overfly Syria on a photo reconnaissance mission, and was shot down by a Syrian Air Force Gloster Meteor. As of 2022, this was the last RAF aircraft shot down in an enemy air-to-air engagement.

21st century 
In 2001, positive relations were developed between Prime Minister Tony Blair and the Syrian government, as part of the War on Terror. 

In 2002, President Bashar al-Assad made an official visit to the United Kingdom, the first Syrian leader to do so. He and his wife Asma met with Queen Elizabeth II.

In 2003, the British Syrian Society was established in London by Fawaz Akhras, father-in-law of Bashar al-Assad.

Since the 2011 civil war, relations have deteriorated, and the UK was one of the first countries to recognise the opposition as the sole legitimate representative of the Syrian people.

The Embassy of Syria in London closed in 2013.

In 2018, the UK took part in the missile strikes against Syria alongside the United States and France.

In March 2021, the British Government placed sanctions on key allies of Assad.

See also 
 List of Ambassadors from the United Kingdom to Syria
 Syrians in the United Kingdom
 William Hague § Syria
 Operation Shader

References 

Syria–United Kingdom relations
Syria
United Kingdom